The Administration of the temporary administrative-territorial unit on the territory of the former South Ossetia Autonomous District, shortly known as the Provisional Administration of South Ossetia (Samxret Osetis droebiti administ’racia), is an administrative body that Georgia regards as the legal government of South Ossetia. The administration was set up by the Georgian government as a transitional measure leading to the settlement of South Ossetia's status. The area lies within the territory of the former South Ossetian Autonomous Oblast which was abolished by the Georgian government in 1990. Since then South Ossetia has no autonomous status within Georgia.

Following the 2008 South Ossetia war, the Provisional Administration has had no South Ossetian territory under its control and remains a nominal entity.

History

The Salvation Union of South Ossetia was founded in October 2006 by the ethnic Ossetians who were outspoken critics and presented a serious opposition to secessionist authorities of Eduard Kokoity.

The group headed by the former defence minister and then prime minister of secessionist government Dmitri Sanakoev organized the so-called alternative presidential election, on November 12, 2006 – parallel to those held by the secessionist authorities in Tskhinvali. High voter turnout was reported by the alternative electoral commission, which estimated over 42,000 voters from both Ossetian (Java district and Tskhinvali) and Georgian (Eredvi, Tamarasheni, etc.) communities of South Ossetia and Sanakoev reportedly received 96% of the votes. Another referendum was organised shortly after asking for the start of negotiations with Georgia on a federal arrangement for South Ossetia received 94% support. However the Salvation Union of South Ossetia turned down a request from a Georgian NGO, “Multinational Georgia”, to monitor it and the released results were very likely to be inflated.

“I, the President of the Republic of South Ossetia, declare before God and Nation that I will protect the interests of the South Ossetian people... I will take care of the security, well-being and revival of South Ossetia and its people,”

Dimitri Sanakoev said in his presidential oath, which he gave in the Ossetian and Georgian languages during the inauguration ceremony held on December 1, 2006.

Soon after Sanakoev formed his government, appointing Uruzmag Karkusov as Prime Minister, Jemal Karkusov (former Interior Minister in the secessionist government) as Interior Minister and Maia Chigoeva-Tsaboshvili (head of the Tbilisi-based non-governmental organization Iber-Ironi Georgian-Ossetian Union) as Foreign Minister.

“This is a historic day. A year ago no one could imagine that South Ossetian flags could appear here in the Georgian-populated village,” Vladimir Sanakoev, co-founder of the Salvation Union of South Ossetia, said.

There were large number of Ossetian flags also used by the South Ossetian secessionist authorities, flown alongside the Georgian flag in Kurta, near Tskhinvali. South Ossetian flags are usually displayed in Tskhinvali by the Separatist controlled territories of the breakaway region alongside of the Russian national flag.

Both the central Georgian government and Sanakoyev's administration considers any negotiations with Kokoity's government meaningless because of its dependence on Moscow. On the other hand, the Tskhinvali leadership and a majority of South Ossetians in the areas it controls dismiss Sanakoev as a "traitor" and perceive that Georgia wants to force a settlement on its own terms having "little respect for their aspirations and fears".

Initially the entity of Sanakoev was known as "the Alternative Government of South Ossetia", but during the course of 2007 the central authorities of Georgia decided to give it official status and on April 13 the formation of "Provisional Administration of South Ossetia" was announced. On May 10, 2007 Dmitry Sanakoev was appointed head of the provisional administration in South Ossetia.

For the first time since the fall of Soviet Union, the former Ossetian secessionist leader gave a speech in the Georgian parliament on May 11, 2007.

In his speech in Ossetian language ( full text), Sanakoev mentioned about the armed conflict which ignited the region in early 90s:

He also mentioned that:  

Sanakoev also mentioned that despite of his high-level position in the South Ossetian secessionist authorities as Prime Minister he failed to build confidence between the two sides and make a breakthrough in the conflict resolution process “because it was beyond my powers.”

As for current situation, Sanakoev mentioned that Tskhinvali secessionist authorities take instruction from “foreign supervisors” who try to thwart confidence-building and provoke hostilities between the two people.

"Our Ossetian children grow up in an environment of endless conflict, under constant stress and tension… They don’t know what is going on beyond checkpoints… We are losing entire generations,”  “I will not allow it! We should not allow it,” he added. “This is our current challenge; this is our current goal: to create a new Ossetia, strong and delightful, free of violence: an Ossetia of free people.”

Many European and US observers and ambassadors who were present during Sanakoev's speech, welcomed his proposition and initiatives. On June 15, 2007 European Union, European Parliament and OSCE supported Georgian initiative for conflict settlement in South Ossetia. EU issued the following statement:

"The EU welcomes the Georgian government’s invitation to the South Ossetian society as a whole – i.e. representatives of all political forces and local groups – to participate actively in discussions on progress towards peaceful conflict resolution.”

The EU mission had met with both Sanakoev and Kokoity in January, 2007. Per Eklund, Head of the European Commission Delegation to Georgia said that “None of the two alternatives do we consider legitimate [in South Ossetia],” 

On July 13, 2007, Georgia set up a state commission, chaired by the Prime Minister Zurab Noghaideli, to develop South Ossetia's autonomous status within the Georgian state. According to the Georgian officials, the status will be elaborated within the framework of "an all-inclusive dialogue" with all the forces and communities within the Ossetian society.

2008 war 

On August 8, 2008, the same day as the 2008 Olympic Games officially commenced, Georgian armed forces moved forward to take control of Tskhinvali. In the next few days, Russian troops pushed back the Georgian army out of South Ossetia and moved farther, occupying Gori in Georgia proper. Following the end of hostilities, the Federation Council of Russia called an extraordinary session for August 25, 2008 to discuss recognition of Abkhazia and South Ossetia. On August 25, the Federation Council unanimously voted to ask the Russian President to recognise independence of South Ossetia and Abkhazia. The Russian parliament voted in favour of this motion the following day. This unilateral recognition by Russia was met by condemnation from some members of the United Nations (including France, Germany, the United Kingdom and the United States) and from NATO, the Organization for Security and Co-operation in Europe and the European Council, due to the violation of Georgia's territorial integrity, of numerous United Nations resolutions on Abkhazia and of international law.

After the war 
The Provisional Administration continues its work in villages with partially Ossetian population outside the borders of South Ossetia proper. The official channel shows festivities on the Ossetian poet Kosta Khetagurov's anniversary and lessons of Ossetian language at a village school. 

Dmitry Sanakoyev headed the administration until he was replaced by Tamaz Bestaev in November 2022.

Office holders

Head

See also 
 South Ossetian Autonomous Oblast
 Government of the Autonomous Republic of Abkhazia
 Autonomous Republic of Adjara

References

External links 
Provisional Administration Website

South Ossetia
Government of Georgia (country)
Autonomous governments in exile
Provisional governments